Roman Dmitrievich Kurtsyn (born 14 March 1985) is a Russian actor.

Selected filmography

References

External links 

1985 births
Living people
Russian male film actors
Russian male stage actors
Russian male television actors
Russian stunt performers
People from Kostroma